The B class as designated in 1913 was a heterogeneous group of torpedo boat destroyers (TBDs) built for the Royal Navy in the late 1890s. All "30 knotter" vessels with four funnels were classified by the Admiralty as the B class in 1913 to provide some system to the naming of HM destroyers.

Fourteen vessels were built by Laird Brothers at Birkenhead (in 1903 to become part of Cammell Laird, Birkenhead), seven by Palmers Shipbuilding and Iron Company at Hebburn-on-Tyne, and one each by Armstrong Whitworth at Walker-on-Tyne, William Doxford and Sons at Sunderland, and J & G Thomson (later to become John Brown and Company) at Clydebank. All vessels had a distinctive "turtleback" forecastle that was intended to clear water from the bow, but actually tended to dig the bow into anything of a sea, resulting in a very wet conning position.

All were powered by triple expansion steam engines and had coal-fired water-tube boilers. Armament was one QF 12-pounder gun on a raised platform at the rear of the forecastle, five QF 6-pounder guns (two sited abreast the conning tower, two sited between the funnels and one on the quarterdeck) and 2 single torpedo tubes for 18-inch (450 mm) torpedoes.

The last two Palmers boats, built in 1908, were replacements for the  Gala and the C-class Tiger that had collided and sunk that year. They were generally similar to the River (or E-class) design, but were grouped with the B class as they possessed four funnels and were similarly armed, and made  on turbines.

Ships
 (all built by Laird, Birkenhead under the 1894–95 programme)
 , launched 24 September 1895, sold for breaking up 23 July 1919.
 , launched 8 October 1895, wrecked off the Yangtze 17 June 1904.
 , launched 5 November 1895, sold for breaking up 4 November 1919.
 , launched 19 November 1895, sold for breaking up 10 October 1919.
 (all built by Laird, Birkenhead under the 1895–96 programme)
 , launched 7 November 1896, sold for breaking up 7 January 1920.
 , launched 21 November 1896, sold for breaking up 7 January 1920.
 , launched 5 December 1896, sold for breaking up 6 October 1919.
 , launched 21 January 1897, sold for breaking up 7 June 1920.
 , launched 6 March 1897, sold for breaking up 17 March 1921.
 , launched 2 June 1897, sold for breaking up 1 July 1921.
Express (built by Laird, Birkenhead as a steam-turbine powered "special" – under the 1896–97 programme)
 , launched 11 December 1897, sold for breaking up 17 March 1920.
Orwell (built by Laird, Birkenhead under the 1897–98 programme)
 , launched 29 September 1898, sold for breaking up 1 July 1920.
 (both built by Laird, Birkenhead under the 1899–1900 programme)
 , launched 14 July 1900, sold for breaking up 1 July 1921.
 , launched 25 August 1900, sold for breaking up 1 July 1921.
Success (built by Doxford, Sunderland under the 1899–1900 programme)
 , launched 21 March 1901, wrecked off Fife Ness 27 December 1914, becoming the first wartime destroyer loss.
Palmers 4-funnelled group (built by Palmers, Jarrow, Spiteful ordered under the 1897–98 programme, three purchased under the 1899–1900 Estimates and the Kangaroo purchased under a supplementary programme for 1900–01)
 , launched 11 January 1899, sold for breaking up 14 September 1920.
 , launched 30 March 1899, sold for breaking up 30 August 1919.
 , launched 26 May 1900, rammed and sunk by SS Hambourn in the English Channel, 26 March 1917.
 , launched 20 December 1900, sold for breaking up 14 September 1920.
 , launched 29 December 1899 and purchased in July 1901, sold for breaking up 23 March 1920.
Arab (built by J & G Thomson, Clydebank as a high-speed "special" under the 1896–97 programme)
 , launched 9 February 1901, sold for breaking up 23 July 1919.
Cobra (built by Armstrong Whitworth, Elswick as a steam-turbine powered "special")
 , launched 28 June 1899 and purchased 8 May 1900, wrecked while on delivery voyage 19 September 1901.
Palmers final group (steam turbine powered)
 , launched 9 October 1906 and purchased 3 May 1909, sold for breaking up 1 August 1919.
 , launched 14 January 1907 and purchased 3 May 1909, sold for breaking up 7 June 1920.

See also
C-class destroyer (1913)
D-class destroyer (1913)

Notes

Bibliography

 

Destroyer classes
 
Ship classes of the Royal Navy